Rebecca John (born 15 April 1970) is a presenter and reporter for Wales Today, BBC Wales on British television.

John was born in the Vale of Glamorgan, Wales.  She read for a degree in French and German at Robinson College, Cambridge, between 1989 and 1993, before completing a postgraduate course in journalism at Trinity & All Saints College. Her first job was a news reporter and presenter at Swansea Sound. She moved to work for BBC Wales in 1994 working in radio news for three years before becoming a TV reporter and news presenter.

Rebecca has also started to learn Welsh and has appeared on the S4C Welsh learners programme, Welsh in a Week.

She lives in Pontcanna, Cardiff.

References

1970 births
Living people
Welsh television presenters
Welsh women television presenters
Welsh journalists
Welsh women journalists
Alumni of Robinson College, Cambridge
BBC newsreaders and journalists
Alumni of Leeds Trinity University